Susanna of Bavaria (2 April 1502 – 23 April 1543) was a German noblewoman. Born in Munich, she was the daughter of Albert IV, Duke of Bavaria, and Kunigunde of Austria, herself the daughter of Holy Roman Emperor Frederick III and Eleanor of Portugal. Her paternal grandparents were Albert III, Duke of Bavaria, and Anna of Brunswick-Grubenhagen-Einbeck.

Biography
Susanna married Casimir, Margrave of Brandenburg-Bayreuth, in 1518. On 14 October 1519, she gave birth to her first child, Marie of Brandenburg-Kulmbach.  Via this daughter, Susanna became an ancestress of King George I of Great Britain and the House of Hanover.  Susanna and Casimir had five children:
 Marie of Brandenburg-Kulmbach, married Elector Palatine Frederick (1519–1576) in 1537.  They were the parents of  Louis VI, Elector Palatine
 Catherine (1520–1521)
 Albert II Alcibiades (1522–1557); Margrave of Brandenburg-Kulmbach
 Kunigunde (1524–1558), married in 1551 Charles II of Baden-Durlach (1529–1577)
 Frederick (1525-1525)

After Casimir's death in 1527, Susanna married Otto Henry, Count Palatine of Neuburg, on 16 October 1529. This second marriage produced no children.

Susanna died on 23 April 1543 in Neuburg an der Donau. She was 41 years old. She never became Electress Palatine, since she died before her second husband acquired the electoral dignity.

Ancestors

References

|-
 

|-
 

1502 births
1543 deaths
House of Wittelsbach
Nobility from Munich
Duchesses of Bavaria
Burials at Munich Frauenkirche
Daughters of monarchs
Remarried royal consorts